Archer's lark (Heteromirafra archeri), also known as the Liben lark, is a species of lark in the family Alaudidae. It is found in Somalia, Somaliland and Ethiopia. Its natural habitats are subtropical or tropical dry shrubland and subtropical or tropical dry lowland grassland. It is threatened by habitat loss. The bird's common name and binomial commemorate the British explorer and colonial official Sir Geoffrey Francis Archer.

Taxonomy and systematics
Formerly, the Liben lark has been considered by some authorities as belonging to the genus Mirafra. The Sidamo lark was previously considered as a separate species (as H. sidamoensis) and by some authorities as a subspecies of Liben lark (as H. a. sidamoensis), but since 2014 has been considered conspecific with the Liben lark. Note that the alternate names "long-clawed lark" and "Sidamo lark" are also used as alternate names by Rudd's lark and Degodi lark respectively. Some authorities have also considered Archer's lark to be a subspecies of Rudd's lark. The alternate name "Somali lark" is more commonly used by the species of the same name, Mirafra somalica, but also as an alternate name for Sharpe's lark. Other alternate names for the Liben lark include Archer's long-clawed lark, Ethiopian long-clawed lark, Sidamo bushlark, Sidamo long-clawed lark and Somali long-clawed lark.

Description
It has buff underparts with a streaky breast. Its plumage is predominantly brown and reddish brown. It has a short, thin tail which is brown with white outer feathers. The call is unknown.

Behaviour
The birds are largely terrestrial and their behaviour is cryptic. Though quite capable of flight, they often prefer to conceal themselves in vegetation.

Breeding
Nests have been found in summer. Clutch-size is three.

Feeding
Its diet is likely to consist of seeds and small invertebrates, including worms.

Distribution and habitat
The total area in which Liben lark can be found is estimated to be only , largely in Ethiopia. The birds have not been recorded from the Wajaale clay plains on the border of Ethiopia and Somaliland since 1922. Due to habitat loss, Archer's lark has not been found in Somalia, since at least 1970.

Status and conservation
The population is estimated to number 50–250 mature individuals, based on a lack of confirmed sightings despite several searches having been conducted since 1955 in Somalia and Ethiopia. One of the last possible sightings of the bird was in Ethiopia in 2003. The species was declared critically endangered in 2005 and a conversation program to restore and protect grasslands has been initiated.

In 2011, David Hoddinott and his bird watching group had a sighting of a bird that may have been a Liben lark in north-eastern Ethiopia. They were able to get a photograph which is being studied to confirm the observation.

Threats
Since 1922 much former habitat in Somaliland has been occupied by refugees and turned into farmland. Grassland is being degraded by the invasive plant Parthenium hysterophorus. Apart from habitat loss to agriculture, pastoralism and invasive weeds, threats include wildfire, severe weather events and climate change.

References

External links

Species factsheet - BirdLife International

Archer's lark
Birds of the Horn of Africa
Archer's lark
Archer's lark
Taxonomy articles created by Polbot